Rachid Aliaoui (born August 14, 1986 in Arles) is a French professional football player. Currently, he plays in the Ligue 2 for AC Arles-Avignon.

1986 births
Living people
French footballers
Ligue 2 players
AC Arlésien players
Association football midfielders